Rudby Hall, Hutton Rudby, Skutterskelfe, North Yorkshire is a country house dating from 1838. Its origins are older but the present building was built for the 10th Viscount Falkland and his wife by the architect Anthony Salvin. The house is Grade II* listed.

History
Lucius Cary, Viscount Falkland inherited the Rudby estate from his aunt, Elizabeth Cary, Lady Amherst in 1830. At that time, the house was called Leven Grove. In the same year, Falkland married Lady Amelia FitzClarence, an illegitimate daughter of William IV and his long-time mistress Dorothea Jordan. On the King's death in 1837, Amelia, with her brothers and sisters, was among the main beneficiaries of her father's will. The Falklands had already commissioned Anthony Salvin to build a new house on the site of the older mansion. The total cost was £16,000. The Falkland family retained ownership of the estate until the end of the 19th century. By this time the house had been renamed Skutterskelfe Hall. It was used subsequently as a family home, a billet during World War II, and the headquarters of a chemicals company. Since the early 21st century it has reverted to use as a home and an events venue, and has seen a further change of name to Rudby Hall. Its first guest was reputedly the singer Liam Gallagher, who described it as a "top gaff [with] nice people". As of 2020, the hall is for sale.

Architecture and description
The architectural historian Jill Allibone considered the hall "a rather large, plain classical building", describing it as Salvin's first foray into the Italian villa style. The building is of two storeys and seven bays, and is constructed in sandstone ashlar. Pevsner notes the porch as a later addition. The hall is a Grade II* listed building. Its listing records the "lovingly restored high-quality Victorian decoration" of the interior.

Various subsidiary structures on the estate have their own Grade II listings; the pump house, the gate lodge, and walls, gate piers and a balustrade in the gardens.

Footnotes

Citations

Sources 

 

Grade II* listed buildings in North Yorkshire
Country houses in North Yorkshire
Grade II* listed houses
Anthony Salvin buildings
Houses completed in 1838